James Emmett "Red" McManamon (March 1, 1905 – August 5, 1954) was an American politician and judge who served as the Attorney General of Indiana from 1949 to 1953.

Biography
McManamon graduated from the Indiana University Maurer School of Law in Bloomington in 1934. McManamon served as a judge of the Speedway Magistrate Court. He also served as director of the Indiana Council of Fraternal and Social Societies.

McManamon, a Democrat, was elected Indiana Attorney General in 1948, succeeding Cleon H. Foust. McManamon served in the administration of Democratic Governor Henry F. Schricker. McManamon was defeated for re-election and succeeded by Republican Edwin K. Steers.

At age 49, McManamon died of a heart attack in a taxi cab.

References

1905 births
1954 deaths
Indiana Attorneys General
Indiana Democrats
People from Indianapolis
Indiana University Maurer School of Law alumni